The 1998 Trans-Am Series was the 33rd season of the Sports Car Club of America's Trans-Am Series.

Results

References

Trans-Am Series
1998 in American motorsport